Zakobiljek is a small settlement in the hills north of Poljane nad Škofjo Loko in the Municipality of Gorenja Vas–Poljane in the Upper Carniola region of Slovenia.

References

External links

Zakobiljek on Geopedia

Populated places in the Municipality of Gorenja vas-Poljane